Cyperus arsenei is a species of sedge that is native to parts of Mexico.

See also 
 List of Cyperus species

References 

arsenei
Plants described in 1944
Flora of Mexico